Mojtaba Najjarian is an Iranian Football midfielder who currently plays for Iranian football club Foolad in the Persian Gulf Pro League.

References

Iranian footballers
1998 births
Living people